Chen Yuanyuan (1624–1681) was a Chinese courtesan who lived during the late Ming and early Qing dynasties. She was the concubine of Wu Sangui, the Ming dynasty general who surrendered Shanhai Pass to the Manchu-led Qing dynasty, and later rebelled in the Revolt of the Three Feudatories. Chen's life and relationship to Wu later became the subject of a number of popular stories and legends, many of them focusing on her supposed role in Wu's fateful decision to defect to the Qing, thereby sealing the fate of the Ming dynasty.

In one story popularized during the Kangxi era, when the peasant Li Zicheng rebelled against the Ming dynasty, he captured Chen Yuanyuan. This enraged Wu Sangui and made him side with the Qing dynasty to crush Li Zicheng's forces.

Biography
Chen Yuanyuan was born to a peasant family in Jiangsu province, and on the death of her father, she became a courtesan. Chen became a leading figure in the Suzhou kunqu scene. An account praised her performance as the maid Hongniang in Romance of the Western Chamber. In 1642, she became the lover of the scholar and poet Mao Xiang, who became infatuated with her after watching her in The Story of the Red Plum, sung in the yiyangqiang style. Subsequently, Chen was bought by the family of Tian Hongyu, father of one of the Chongzhen Emperor's concubines. She was then either purchased for Wu Sangui by his father, or given to Wu as a gift by Tian.

She is one of the Eight Beauties of Qinhuai described by late Qing officials. The other famed courtesans of this group are Ma Xianglan, Li Xiangjun, Dong Xiaowan, Gu Mei, and Liu Rushi.

After failing to deter Wu Sangui's rebellion, Chen asked General Ma Bao to escort her and her son with Wu Sangui, Wu Qihua, to what is now known as the Majia Zhai village in Guizhou, where they would hide amongst the ethnic minorities who were hostile to Qing rule. Seen as a connection to a failed uprising, this knowledge was subsequently only passed down by oral history until the 20th century, when it was published by historian Huang Tousong. The inscription on the tombstones were intentionally cryptic to deter detection throughout the years but has been confirmed by government historians in 2005. Locals believe that she retired as a nun later in life.

In fiction

In April 1644, the rebel army of Li Zicheng captured the Ming capital of Beijing, and the Chongzhen Emperor Zhu Youjian committed suicide. Knowing that Wu Sangui's formidable army at Ningyuan posed a serious threat, Li immediately made overtures to gain Wu's allegiance. Li sent two letters to Wu, including one in the name of Wu's father, then held captive in Beijing. Before Wu Sangui could respond, he received word that his entire household had been slaughtered. Wu then wrote to the Qing regent, Dorgon, indicating his willingness to combine forces to oust the rebels from Beijing, thus setting the stage for the Qing conquest of Ming.

In popular lore, however, Chen Yuanyuan takes a more dramatic and romanticized role in these pivotal events. According to stories that emerged in the Kangxi era, Wu Sangui's motivation for joining forces with the Qing to attack Li Zicheng was that Li had abducted and (by some accounts) raped Chen, Wu's beloved concubine. This version of the tale was made famous by Wu Weiye's qu, the Song of Yuanyuan:

Although such stories tying the downfall of the dynasty to the relationship between Wu and Chen proved popular, some historians regard them as products of popular fiction. By some accounts, Chen Yuanyuan was raped and killed in the fall of Beijing. But, by other accounts, it is believed that she was subsequently reunited with Wu Sangui. One story claims that later in life, she changed her name and became a nun in Kunming after Wu Sangui's failed rebellion against the Qing. This story may also be a later fabrication, or popular folklore.

References

Bibliography

See also
 The Deer and the Cauldron, a wuxia novel by Jin Yong in which Chen appears.
The Green Phoenix: A Novel of the Woman Who Re-made Asia, Empress Xiaozhuang, a historical novel by Alice Poon in which Chen has a minor role.
Tales of Ming Courtesans, a historical novel by Alice Poon in which Chen is one of the three protagonists, the other two being Liu Rushi and Li Xiangjun.

1624 births
1681 deaths
Ming dynasty people
Qing dynasty people
Chinese concubines
17th-century Chinese people
17th-century Chinese women
Shun dynasty
Eight Beauties of Qinhuai
17th-century Chinese actresses
17th-century Chinese women singers
Ming dynasty actors
Kunqu actresses
Singers from Jiangsu
Actresses from Jiangsu